The Narendra Modi Stadium, (formerly known as Motera Stadium or Sardar Vallabhbhai Patel Stadium) is a cricket stadium situated in Sardar Vallabhbhai Patel Sports Complex, Ahmedabad, India. It is the largest stadium in the world, with a seating capacity of 132,000 spectators. Owned by the Gujarat Cricket Association and is a venue for Test, ODI, T20I, and Indian Premier League cricket matches.

The stadium was constructed in 1983 and was first renovated in 2006. It became the regular venue for international matches in the city.

Apart from cricket, the stadium has hosted several programs arranged by the Government of Gujarat. It has hosted matches during the 1987, 1996, and 2011 Cricket World Cups. As of 2022, the stadium has hosted 14 Tests, 27 ODIs, 6 T20I matches and 2 IPL matches including the finals of 2022 edition for which it got the Guinness Book of World Records for having the highest recorded match attendance at 101,566 spectators.

On 24 February 2021, the stadium was renamed as the Narendra Modi Stadium by the Gujarat Cricket Association after the current Prime Minister of India, Narendra Modi, a Gujarat native, who was also the president of Gujarat Cricket Association (2009–2014) and the chief minister of the state from 2001 - 2014. It hosted its first ever pink ball test match on 24 February 2021 between India and England.

History

1982–2006 (Early years)
Formerly known as the Gujarat Stadium, the ground was renamed in tribute to Sardar Vallabhbhai Patel, India's first Home Minister and Deputy Prime Minister. Before the Sardar Patel Stadium, international cricket matches in the city were played at the Ahmedabad Municipal Corporation's stadium of the same name (Sardar Patel Stadium) in the Navrangpura area. In 1982, the Government of Gujarat donated a  stretch of land on the banks of the Sabarmati River to build a new stadium. The construction of the Sardar Patel Stadium was completed in nine months. Since then, all International cricket fixtures for the city are hosted here. In the 1984–85 Australia-India series, Sardar Patel Stadium hosted its first ODI, in which Australia defeated India.

Sunil Gavaskar was the first cricketer to score 10,000 runs in Test cricket against Pakistan in the stadium in 1987. In 1983, Kapil Dev took a nine-wicket haul against the West Indies in 1983, and claimed his 432nd Test wicket at the stadium to become the highest wicket-taker in the world in 1995, which broke Sir Richard Hadlee's previous record. In 1996, the ground hosted a low-scoring Test match against South Africa, where the visitors lost 105–170. Javagal Srinath took six wickets in the fourth inning of the match. South Africa won in a rematch game when they bowled India out for 76 runs in the first session of the Test match in 2008 and won the game by an inning and 90 runs.

2006–2015 (Rise to prominence)
The stadium became a focal venue of ICC Champions Trophy in 2006 and hosted five of the 15 games played. In order to host the tournament, the stadium was renovated to add three new pitches and a new outfield. Floodlights and covered stands were introduced at the stadium as a part of the renovation program.

The Sardar Patel Stadium has hosted games whenever India has hosted the Cricket World Cup, including the first match of the 1996 World Cup between England and New Zealand. However, while the stadium hosted only one game each in 1987 and 1996, it hosted three games in the 2011 World Cup, including the quarter-finals between Australia and India. Sachin Tendulkar became the first cricketer to score 18,000 runs in One Day Internationals. As of 19 August 2017, Sardar Patel has hosted 12 Tests, 23 ODIs and 1 T20I.

2015–2020 (Reconstruction)

In October 2015, the stadium was demolished for reconstruction, though some media referred to it as a renovation. The total cost of reconstruction was estimated to be ₹700 crores. The redevelopment, originally planned to be completed in 2019, finished in February 2020.

Conception
The idea to build the new stadium was reportedly proposed by Narendra Modi, the president of the Gujarat Cricket Association and the Chief Minister of Gujarat at the time. Shortly before Modi moved to Delhi after becoming the Prime Minister of India, there were discussions about minor upgrades to the stadium and development of the structure at the pavilion end. Modi asked the officials to build a new larger stadium instead of minor renovation work.

Bids
After starting demolition work at the end of 2015, the Gujarat Cricket Association issued a request for tender on 1 January 2016 in The Times of India and The Indian Express. Nine bidders showed interest and purchased the tender documents, out of which three submitted Technical and Financial bids on time; they were the Shapoorji Pallonji Group, Nagarjuna Construction Company, and Larsen & Toubro. A Tender Commercial Committee (TCC) of nine experts was formed to evaluate tenders. Additionally, STUP Consultants, a Civil Engineering consultancy firm based in Mumbai, was appointed as the Project Management Consultant to evaluate proposals and technical details of each bid working with the TCC.

Each of the three bidders presented their designs, models, and technical details of their concepts & designs. Because of the sheer size and complexity of the project, the bidders were evaluated on multiple parameters like efficiency, resources, the time frame of completion, ease of implementation etc. The bidders were ranked and weighted on all of the parameters.

In the end, L&T was finalized as the Principal Contractor to build and design the stadium.

Work
L&T took over the construction work of the stadium in December 2016. On 16 January 2017, the Gujarat Cricket Association oversaw the project, which formally began on the same day. The stadium was planned to be finished in 2 years and the reconstruction project was estimated to cost around ₹700 crore ($93 million). Finishing touches were given to the stadium in February 2020 and it hosted an England-India day-night test match in 2021.

Mumbai-based Commercial Kitchen Consultants "Span Asia" were hired to work with Populous and L&T on all the F&B Related areas such as the Concession Counters, Main Stadium Kitchens, Player Kitchens, VIP/VVIP Boxes, Corporate Boxes, Press & Media Boxes, Pantries, GCA Club and Related areas.

Stadium design and facilities
The redesigned stadium occupies 63 acres of land, with three entry points as compared to one in the old stadium, with a metro line at one of the entry points. It contains 76 corporate boxes that can hold 25 persons each, a 55-room clubhouse, an Olympic sized swimming pool, and four dressing rooms. A unique feature of the stadium is the LED lights on the roof instead of the usual floodlights at cricket grounds. The LED lights are installed on an antibacterial, fireproof canopy with PTFE membrane that covers  out of  width of sitting area. The roof was done by the company Walter P Moore and was specifically designed to be lightweight and separate from the seating bowls in order to make it fairly earthquake resistant. The structure eliminates the need for pillars and gives spectators an unobstructed view of the entire field from any place in the Stadium.
 
Outside of the main ground, the stadium is able to accommodate several other features, including an Olympic-sized swimming pool, an indoor cricket academy, badminton and tennis courts, a Squash arena, a table tennis area, a 3D projector theater, and a clubhouse with three practice grounds and 50 rooms. The parking lot can accommodate 3,000 cars and 10,000 two-wheelers. The Narendra Modi  Stadium also has a huge ramp designed to facilitate the movement of around 60,000 people simultaneously. The stadium has been designed such that patrons fill the lower levels of the ground for smaller events to maintain the crowd atmosphere when not at full capacity.

It has also been planned that the stadium will be connected to the metro station by a skywalk to decrease road congestion. The skywalk is planned to be completed after September 2020, and is a part of the Motera Metro Station project rather than the stadium's.

The total area of the stadium is equivalent to 32 Olympic-size association football fields. It is also the only stadium in the world with 11 centre pitches on the main ground.

Major events

Namaste Trump
The stadium was the venue of the Namaste Trump event and hosted US President Donald Trump and Indian Prime minister Narendra Modi on 24 February 2020. The event mirrored the "Howdy Modi" event held in Houston, Texas.

Hosted Australian PM 

The stadium was the venue for the fourth test match of the Border Gavaskar trophy, in 2023,  where the Indian PM Narendra Modi and Australian PM Anthony Albanese participated to celebrate 75 years of diplomatic and cricket relations.

Records

Test match records

 Highest innings total: Sri Lanka 760/7d – India v Sri Lanka, 2nd innings, 16 November 2009
 Lowest innings total: India 76 – India v South Africa, 1 inning, 3 April 2008
 Highest individual score: Mahela Jayawardene 275 (Balls: 435 4x27 6x1) – Sri Lanka v India, 16 November 2009
 Best bowling:(in an innings) Kapil Dev 9/83 – India v West Indies, 12 November 1983(in a match) Axar Patel 11/70 – India v England, 13 February 2021
 Most runs: Rahul Dravid (India) 771 Runs (Mat:7 Inn:14 HS:222 Ave:59.30 SR:49.10 100x3 50x1), Sachin Tendulkar – 642 runs, VVS Laxman – 574 runs
 Most wickets: Anil Kumble (India) 36 Wickets (Mat:7 Runs:964 BBI:7/115 BBM:10/233 Ave:26.77 Econ:2.29 SR:70.1 5W/I:3 10W/M:1), Harbhajan Singh- 29 wickets, Kapil Dev – 14 wickets

One Day International match records

 Highest total: South Africa 365/2 – India v South Africa, 1st innings, 27 February 2010
 Lowest total: Zimbabwe 85 – Zimbabwe v West Indies, 1st innings, 8 October 2006
 Highest individual score: Sourav Ganguly 144 (Balls:152 4x8 6x6) – India v Zimbabwe, 5 December 2000
 Best bowling: Mitchell Johnson 4/19 (9.2 overs) – Australia v Zimbabwe, 21 February 2011
 Most runs: Chris Gayle – 316 runs, Sachin Tendulkar – 215 runs
 Most wickets: Kapil Dev (India) 10 Wickets (Mat:6 Runs:156 Best:3/26 Ave:15.60 Econ:3.04), Lasith Malinga – 7 wickets, Chris Gayle- 6 wickets

Notable events

Sardar Patel Stadium was where some notable events occurred:
 First Day Night Test Match Played on 24 February 2021 between India vs England
 Sunil Gavaskar completed 10,000 runs in Test cricket in 1986–87 against Pakistan.
 Kapil Dev, who had taken 9 wickets in an innings in the first match on this ground, taking his 432nd wicket in Test cricket to pass Sir Richard Hadlee's record in 1994.
 In October 1999, Sachin Tendulkar scored his first Test Match double-hundred in a match against New Zealand.
 Sachin Tendulkar completed his 20 years of International Cricket in the stadium on 16 November 2009 against Sri Lanka. During the same game, Sachin Tendulkar reached a landmark of 30,000 runs in International cricket.
 Sachin Tendulkar became the first-ever cricketer to score 18,000 runs in one day cricket in a match against Australia during 2011 Cricket World Cup.
 AB de Villiers reached his first double-hundred against India during the second test of South Africa's tour to India in 2008.
 IPL 2022 Final between the Gujarat Titans and the Rajasthan Royals.
 Jos Buttler scored 39 runs during the IPL 2022 final to end the season with a total of 863 runs in the season, the second highest in IPL history.

Cricket World Cup

Sardar Patel Stadium has hosted One Day Internationals (ODIs) for all the Cricket World Cups held in India.

1987 Cricket World Cup

1996 Cricket World Cup

2011 Cricket World Cup

Gallery

See also
 Melbourne Cricket Ground
 Gujarat Titans
 List of stadiums by capacity
 List of stadiums in India
 List of cricket grounds by capacity
 Dadra and Nagar Haveli Cricket Association
 Baroda Cricket Association
 Saurashtra Cricket Association
 Gujarat Lions

References

External links
 

Test cricket grounds in India
Cricket in Ahmedabad
Cricket grounds in Gujarat
Sports venues in Ahmedabad
1987 Cricket World Cup stadiums
1996 Cricket World Cup stadiums
2011 Cricket World Cup stadiums
1983 establishments in Gujarat
Sports venues completed in 1983
20th-century architecture in India